Xavier Doyle Truss (born July 13, 2001), is an American football guard for the Georgia Bulldogs. He is the highest rated recruit in Rhode Island high school football history.

Early life and high school  
Truss was born on July 13, 2001, in West Warwick, Rhode Island. He played high school football for Bishop Hendricken High School where he was selected to represent the East in the 2019 All-American Bowl, he was also invited to the All-American high school combine in San Antonio. In his junior year he was a Providence First-Team All-State selection, while leading Bishop Hendricken to back-to-back Rhode Island State Super Bowl appearances, winning in 2018.

College career 
In 2019, Truss started his freshman year with the Bulldogs by being redshirted, seeing action against Murray State, Arkansas State, and Georgia Tech.

In 2020, as a redshirt freshman, Truss started at tackle in Georgia's Chick-fil-A Peach Bowl win over Cincinnati. He also played as a reserve offensive linemen in games against Arkansas, Auburn, Tennessee, USC, and Missouri.

In 2021, entering his sophomore year, Truss made the transition from tackle to guard. He played in reserve in all fifteen of Georgia's games, playing the most out of his entire career at the time against Tennessee.

In 2022, Truss was projected to battle for a starting spot on the offensive line over the offseason, Truss won the battle ahead of the 2022 season beating redshirt sophomore Devin Willock. Truss started in eleven of twelve games, only missing the team's games against Tennessee due to injury. He started in the team's 62 to seven win over TCU in the 2023 College Football Playoff National Championship at left guard as they went back-to-back.

Personal life  
Xavier Truss is the son of Steve and Gina Truss and he has two younger sisters.

References

External links
Georgia Bulldogs bio

2001 births
Living people
Players of American football from Rhode Island
People from West Warwick, Rhode Island
American football offensive guards
Georgia Bulldogs football players
Bishop Hendricken High School alumni